Laurinaitis is a Lithuanian surname that may refer to:

Athletes
Joe Laurinaitis (born 1960), former pro wrestler
James Laurinaitis (born 1986), American football player, son of Joe
John Laurinaitis (born 1962), executive and former wrestler, younger brother of Joe and Marcus, uncle to James
Marcus Laurinaitis (born 1964), wrestler, younger brother of Joe, elder brother to John, uncle to James